Dingir (usually transliterated DIĜIR) is a Sumerian word for "god" or "goddess".  Its cuneiform sign is most commonly employed as the determinative for religious names and related concepts, in which case it is not pronounced and is conventionally transliterated as a superscript "d" as in e.g. dInanna.

The cuneiform sign by itself was originally an ideogram for the Sumerian word an ("sky" or "heaven"); its use was then extended to a logogram for the word diĝir ("god" or "goddess") and the supreme deity of the Sumerian pantheon An, and a phonogram for the syllable . In Hittite orthography, the syllabic value of the sign was again only an.

The concept of "divinity" in Sumerian is closely associated with the heavens, as is evident from the fact that the cuneiform sign doubles as the ideogram for "sky", and that its original shape is the picture of a star. It is also of note that the eight-pointed star was a chief symbol for the goddess Inanna. The original association of "divinity" is thus with "bright" or "shining" hierophanies in the sky.

Cuneiform sign

Sumerian

The Sumerian sign DIĜIR  originated as a star-shaped ideogram indicating a god in general, or the Sumerian god An, the supreme father of the gods. Dingir also meant sky or heaven in contrast with ki which meant earth. Its emesal pronunciation was dimer. (The use of m instead of ĝ [ŋ] was a typical phonological feature in emesal dialect.)

The plural of diĝir can be diĝir-diĝir, among others.

Assyrian
  The Assyrian sign DIĜIR (ASH  𒀸 and MAŠ 𒈦, see cuneiform sign AN) could mean:

 the Akkadian nominal stem il- meaning "god" or "goddess", derived from the Semitic ''ʾil-
 the god Anum (An)
 the Akkadian word šamû meaning "sky"
 the syllables an and il (from the Akkadian word god: An or Il, or from gods with these names)
 a preposition meaning "at" or "to"
 a determinative indicating that the following word is the name of a god

According to one interpretation, DINGIR could also refer to a priest or priestess although there are other Akkadian words ēnu and ēntu that are also translated priest and priestess.  For example, nin-dingir (lady divine) meant a priestess who received foodstuffs at the temple of Enki in the city of Eridu.

Digital encoding
The cuneiform sign is encoded in Unicode (as of version 5.0) under its name AN at U+1202D .

See also

 Religions of the ancient Near East
 Mesopotamian mythology

Notes

References

Mesopotamian deities
Sumerian words and phrases
Cuneiform determinatives